Stagonomus is a genus of shieldbug belonging to the family Pentatomidae, subfamily Pentatominae.

Species
Species within this genus include:
 Stagonomus amoenus  (Brullé, 1832) 
 Stagonomus bipunctatus  (Linnaeus, 1758) 
 Stagonomus devius  Seidenstücker, 1965
 Stagonomus grenieri  Signoret, 1865
 Stagonomus venustissimus  (Schrank, 1776)

References 

Insects described in 1852
Hemiptera of Europe
Pentatomidae genera
Eysarcorini